"The Apple Stretching" is a song by American recording artist Grace Jones, released as a single in 1982.

Background
"The Apple Stretching" was written by Melvin Van Peebles for his 1982 play Waltz of the Stork. The song describes New York City in the early morning. It was included on Jones' sixth album Living My Life and also released as a double A-side single with "Nipple to the Bottle", written by Jones and Sly Dunbar (which also got a separate single release in certain territories). The original 7-minute song's single edit was just the album version, faded out at 3:33. "The Apple Stretching" was simultaneously released as a 12" version, clocking in at 8:40. It included a second verse of the song, which had been omitted on the album version, where Jones sings together with a bass guitar only along with funky percussion. This version remains unreleased on CD. 

Van Peebles said of being able to do the song, "I couldn't have done [that track before], because people weren't used to [paying attention to] music and words simultaneously." He performed the song on his own album, Ghetto Gothic in 1995.

Track listing
7" single
A. "The Apple Stretching" – 3:33
B. "Nipple to the Bottle" – 4:22

12" single
A. "The Apple Stretching" – 8:40
B. "Nipple to the Bottle" – 6:59

Chart performance

References

1982 singles
Grace Jones songs
Songs about New York City
1982 songs
Song recordings produced by Chris Blackwell
Song recordings produced by Alex Sadkin